The Percha Formation is a geologic formation in southern New Mexico. It preserves fossils dating back to the Famennian Age of the late Devonian period.

Description
The formation consists mostly of black to gray shale and minor limestone. It rests on a regional unconformity, so that the underlying formation may be the Fusselman Formation, the Sly Gap Formation, or the Onate Formation. It underlies the Lake Valley Limestone, Caballero Formation, Escabrosa Limestone, or other Mississippian formations.

The formation is divided into two members. It is highly fossiliferous.

Fossils
The base of the formation contains fossils of arthrodiran fish, shark teeth, late Fammenian conodonts, brachiopods, and corals. The Box Member contains fossils of brachiopods, crinoids, bryozoans, sponges, corals, and late Fammenian conodonts.

History of investigation
The formation was first named as the Percha Shale by C.H. Gordon in 1907 for exposures at Percha Creek. However, a type section was not designated until 1945, by F.V. Stevenson. Stevenson also divided the formation into the lower Ready Pay Member and the upper Box Member. D. Schumacher and coinvestigators mapped the formation into southeastern Arizona and renamed it the Percha Formation in 1976.

See also

 List of fossiliferous stratigraphic units in New Mexico
 Paleontology in New Mexico

Footnotes

References
 
 
 
 

Devonian formations of New Mexico